The Autumn of Pride is a 1921 British silent romance film directed by W. P. Kellino and starring Nora Swinburne, David Hawthorne and Mary Dibley. It was an adaptation of a novel by E. Newton Bungay.

Cast
 Nora Swinburne – Peggy Naylor
 David Hawthorne – John Lytton
 Mary Dibley – Helen Stone
 Cecil Morton York – Abel Lytton
 Cecil del Gue – Mr. Naylor
 Clifford Heatherley – George Pentecost
 Donald Castle – Willoughby
 C. Hargrave Mansell – Handley

References

Bibliography
 Low, Rachael. History of the British Film, 1918–1929. George Allen & Unwin, 1971.

External links

1921 films
British romance films
British silent feature films
1920s romance films
British black-and-white films
Films directed by W. P. Kellino
Films shot at Lime Grove Studios
Films based on British novels
1920s English-language films
1920s British films
English-language romance films